Bexhill is an unincorporated community in Saskatchewan.

Stonehenge No. 73, Saskatchewan
Unincorporated communities in Saskatchewan
Division No. 3, Saskatchewan